RC Herning is a Danish rugby club in Herning. As they are a new team, they usually combine with other teams to play matches.

History
The club was founded in 2011.

References

Danish rugby union teams
Sport in Herning
Rugby clubs established in 2011